Constant Mentzas is a Canadian film director, screenwriter and restaurateur from Montreal, Quebec. He is most noted for the short films Aspiration, which was a Jutra Award nominee for Best Live Action Short Film at the 5th Jutra Awards and won the award for Best Canadian Short Film at the 2003 Toronto International Film Festival, and Gilles, which was a Genie Award nominee for Best Live Action Short Drama at the 30th Genie Awards in 2010.

He subsequently left the film business to take over ownership and operation of Ikanos, his father's Greek restaurant in Montreal.

References

External links

21st-century Canadian screenwriters
21st-century Canadian male writers
Canadian male screenwriters
Film directors from Montreal
Canadian people of Greek descent
Canadian restaurateurs
Living people
Writers from Montreal
Year of birth missing (living people)